Kim Young-woo (born June 15, 1984) is a South Korean football player who currently plays for Jeonnam Dragons.

Club honours
At Gyeongnam FC
Korean FA Cup runner-up: 1
 2008

At Jeonbuk Hyundai Motors
K League: 1
 2011

References

External links

1984 births
Living people
South Korean footballers
Gyeongnam FC players
Jeonbuk Hyundai Motors players
Ansan Mugunghwa FC players
Jeonnam Dragons players
K League 2 players
K League 1 players
Association football midfielders